Muhsen Saleh Abdullah Ali Al-Ghassani (born 27 March 1997) is an Omani professional footballer who plays as a forward for the Oman national team and last played for Sepahan.

Career
Al-Ghassani was included in Oman's squad for the 2019 AFC Asian Cup in the United Arab Emirates.

Career statistics

International

International goals
Scores and results list Oman's goal tally first.

References

External links
 
 
Muhsen Al-Ghassani  on Instagram
 
 
Muhsen  Al-Ghassani  at Soccerway 
Muhsen Al-Ghassani   FIFA competition record 
Muhsen Al-Ghassani   at Goalzz.com (available in Arabic at Kooora.com) 
Muhsen Al-Ghassani  at Fifa 

*

1997 births
Living people
People from Al-Rustaq
Omani footballers
Oman international footballers
Association football forwards
Suwaiq Club players
Oman Professional League players
2019 AFC Asian Cup players